Statistics of Veikkausliiga in the 1992 season. This was the first season under the Veikkausliiga brand.

Overview
It was contested by 12 teams, and HJK Helsinki won the championship.

League standings

Results

Matches 1–22

Matches 23–33

See also
Ykkönen (Tier 2)

References
Finland - List of final tables (RSSSF)

Veikkausliiga seasons
Fin
Fin
1